Expeditionary maneuver warfare (EMW) is the current concept that guides how the United States Marine Corps organizes, deploys and employs its forces.  Utilizing maneuver warfare and the Marine Corps' expeditionary heritage, EMW emphasizes strategically agile and tactically flexible Marine Air Ground Task Forces with the capability to project power against critical points in the littorals and beyond.

EMW was designed to fit the United States Navy's "Sea Basing" concept as outlined in the Sea Power 21 plan.

This concept has influenced Marine Corps equipment procurement in recent years, leading to the purchase of the MV-22 Osprey, Expeditionary Fighting Vehicle, F-35B Lightning II, CH-53K King Stallion and the M777 Lightweight Howitzer.

Two areas of current concern are not overburdening the maneuver force with too many supplies (or worse, having them run out) and timely medical evacuation.

Supporting operational concepts
 Ship-to-objective maneuver (STOM)  
 Enhanced networked sea basing 
 Sustained operations ashore 
 Other expeditionary operations

See also
Military logistics
Military Sealift Command

References

Headquarters Marine Corps – pdf
 National Defense Magazine

United States Marine Corps